Vernon may refer to:

Places

Australia
Vernon County, New South Wales

Canada
Vernon, British Columbia, a city
Vernon, Ontario

France
Vernon, Ardèche
Vernon, Eure

United States
 Vernon, Alabama
 Vernon, Arizona
 Vernon, California
 Lake Vernon, California
 Vernon, Colorado
 Vernon, Connecticut
 Vernon, Delaware
 Vernon, Florida, a city
 Vernon Lake (Idaho)
 Vernon, Illinois
 Vernon, Indiana
 Vernon, Kansas
 Vernon Community, Hestand, Kentucky 
 Vernon Parish, Louisiana
 Vernon Lake, a man-made lake in the parish
 Vernon, Michigan
 Vernon Township, Isabella County, Michigan
 Vernon Township, Shiawassee County, Michigan
 Vernon, Jasper County, Mississippi
 Vernon, Madison County, Mississippi
 Vernon, Winston County, Mississippi
 Vernon Township, New Jersey
 Vernon (town), New York
 Vernon (village), New York
 Vernon (Mount Olive, North Carolina), a historic plantation house
 Vernon Township, Crawford County, Ohio
 Vernon Township, Scioto County, Ohio
 Vernon Township, Trumbull County, Ohio
 Vernon, Oklahoma
 Vernon, Portland, Oregon, a neighborhood of Portland
 Vernon, Texas
 Vernon, Utah
 Vernon, Vermont
 Vernon, West Virginia
 Vernon, Wisconsin, a village
 Vernon (community), Wisconsin, an unincorporated community
 Vernon County, Wisconsin

Multiple countries
 Mount Vernon (disambiguation)

People and fictional characters
 Vernon (given name), a list of people and fictional characters with the given name
 Vernon (surname), including a list of people with the surname
 Dai Vernon, pen name of Eliza D. Keith (1854–1939), American educator, suffragist and journalist
 Vernon (rapper), American rapper and songwriter, member of boy group SEVENTEEN

Other uses
 HMS Vernon, two ships and a training establishment of the British Royal Navy
 Vickers Vernon, a British military cargo aircraft of the interwar period
 Vernon (1839), a paddle steamer built in 1839
 Baron Vernon, a title in Great Britain
 Vernon Systems, a museum collections management software company based in New Zealand
 Vernons, a football pool company
 Vernon Automobile Corporation
 Tropical Storm Vernon, several tropical cyclones named Vernon

See also
 Vernon Islands (disambiguation)